Freire Vergara Vanessa Lorena (born July 3, 1978) is an Ecuador politician. In 2021 she was a member of Union for Hope. She is a member of the National Assembly

Life 
Freire was born in Babahoyo. She studied Business Administration at the Metropolitan University of Ecuador.

In February 2021 she was elected to be a member of the fourth National Assembly of Ecuador.

In July 2021 Freire left the Union for Hope citing organisation differences. In 2022 she was an independent assembly member, she was aligned with the "Bank of the National Agreement" group, but her, and seven others, loyalty was questioned as that group was in decline.

In June 2022 she was representing the ruling party at a hearing established to try a charge against Yeseña Guamaní.

References 

1978 births
Living people
People from Babahoyo
Members of the National Assembly (Ecuador)
Women members of the National Assembly (Ecuador)